Sabine County is a county located on the central eastern border of the U.S. state of Texas. As of the 2020 census, its population was 9,894. The county was organized on December 14, 1837, and named for the Sabine River, which forms its eastern border.

Geography

Major highways
  U.S. Highway 96
  State Highway 21
  State Highway 87
  State Highway 103
  State Highway 184

National Protected Areas
 Sabine National Forest (part)

Adjacent counties and parish
 Shelby County (north)
 Sabine Parish, Louisiana (east)
 Newton County (south)
 Jasper County (southwest)
 San Augustine County (west)

History
Like other eastern Texas counties, Sabine was originally developed as cotton plantations, which depended on the labor of numerous enslaved African Americans. After the Civil War and emancipation, many freedmen remained in the rural area, working as tenant farmers and sharecroppers. There was considerable violence by whites against blacks during and after Reconstruction. After 1877 and through the early 20th century, Sabine County had 10 lynchings of blacks by whites in acts of racial terrorism. This was the fourth-highest total in the state, where lynchings took place in nearly all counties through this period.

From 1930 to 1970, the population declined as many African Americans left this rural county and other parts of the South in the Great Migration to escape Jim Crow oppression and seek better jobs, especially in Northern industrial cities and on the West Coast, where the defense industry built up during World War II.

Demographics

2020 census

Note: the US Census treats Hispanic/Latino as an ethnic category. This table excludes Latinos from the racial categories and assigns them to a separate category. Hispanics/Latinos can be of any race.

2000 Census
As of the census of 2000, there were 10,469 people, 4,485 households, and 3,157 families residing in the county.  The population density was 21 people per square mile (8/km2).  There were 7,659 housing units at an average density of 16 per square mile (6/km2).  The racial makeup of the county was 87.85% White, 9.92% Black or African American, 0.41% Native American, 0.09% Asian, 0.03% Pacific Islander, 0.82% from other races, and 0.88% from two or more races.  1.81% of the population were Hispanic or Latino of any race.

There were 4,485 households, out of which 23.60% had children under the age of 18 living with them, 58.90% were married couples living together, 8.70% had a female householder with no husband present, and 29.60% were non-families. 27.00% of all households were made up of individuals, and 15.40% had someone living alone who was 65 years of age or older.  The average household size was 2.31 and the average family size was 2.78.

In the county, the population was spread out, with 21.10% under the age of 18, 5.60% from 18 to 24, 21.10% from 25 to 44, 27.20% from 45 to 64, and 24.90% who were 65 years of age or older.  The median age was 47 years. For every 100 females there were 93.40 males.  For every 100 females age 18 and over, there were 92.70 males.

The median income for a household in the county was $27,198, and the median income for a family was $32,554. Males had a median income of $28,695 versus $21,141 for females. The per capita income for the county was $15,821.  About 11.80% of families and 15.90% of the population were below the poverty line, including 23.90% of those under age 18 and 12.70% of those age 65 or over.

Education
The following school districts serve Sabine County:
 Brookeland Independent School District (partial)
 Hemphill Independent School District
 Shelbyville Independent School District (partial)
 West Sabine Independent School District

The county is in the service area of Angelina College.

Communities

Cities
 Hemphill (county seat)
 Pineland

Unincorporated areas

Census-designated places 
 Milam

Unincorporated communities 
 Bronson
 Brookeland (partly in Jasper County)
 Fairmount
 Geneva
 Isla
 Pendleton Harbor
 Rosevine
 Sexton
 Yellowpine

Historical communities

 Bayou
 East Mayfield
 Fairdale
 Gravehill
 Pendleton
 Plainview
 Sabinetown
 Tebo
 Time
 Vesta

COVID-19 pandemic
In July 2021, Sabine County ranked the highest in the United States for cases of Coronavirus per 100,000 people. Deaths in Texas are especially high among those that had not been vaccinated.

Politics
Sabine County has become a solidly Republican county since the beginning of the 21st century but previously leaned Democratic, voting for Bill Clinton in both 1992 and 1996 and also against Texan George H. W. Bush in 1988 and 1992.

Sabine County is represented in the Texas House of Representatives by Republican Chris Paddie, a radio broadcaster and former mayor of Marshall in Harrison County.

See also

 National Register of Historic Places listings in Sabine County, Texas
 Recorded Texas Historic Landmarks in Sabine County

References

External links

 Sabine County website
 Sabine County Chamber of Commerce
 

 
1837 establishments in the Republic of Texas
Populated places established in 1837